Woods Island State Park is a state park on Lake Champlain in Vermont. The park comprises the 125-acre Woods Island, and is located off St. Albans Point in Franklin County, Vermont.  It is administered by the Vermont Department of Forests, Parks, and Recreation, as part of the Vermont State Park system. The park can only be reached by boat, and visitors must make their own arrangements to get there. There is no dock.

Woods Island features five primitive campsites, with minimal sanitary facilities and no potable water supply. Reservations are necessary for camping.

References

External links
Official website

State parks of Vermont
Protected areas of Franklin County, Vermont
Landforms of Franklin County, Vermont
Islands of Vermont
St. Albans, Vermont
Protected areas established in 1985
1985 establishments in Vermont